Alfred Holmes "Fritz" Von Kolnitz (May 20, 1893 – March 18, 1948) was a Major League Baseball third baseman who played for three seasons. He played for the Cincinnati Reds from 1914 to 1915 and the Chicago White Sox in 1916.

Due to his Prussian-sounding surname, he used the name "R.H. Holmes" when first starting in 1913, due to the anti-German sentiment that existed at the time.

References

External links

1893 births
1948 deaths
American people of German descent
Major League Baseball third basemen
Baseball players from South Carolina
Cincinnati Reds players
Chicago White Sox players
College of Charleston Cougars baseball players
Cleveland Counts players
Morristown Jobbers players
Charleston Gulls players
Charleston Palmettos players
Charleston Pals players